Associazione Sportiva Dilettantistica La Biellese is an Italian football club, based in Biella, Piedmont that currently plays in Eccellenza Piedmont and Aosta Valley.

History

Early years
The historic club was founded in 1902 as U.S. Biellese. In 1930 the club changed its name to A.S. Biellese. Refounded in 1945 following the end of World War II, they resumed from Serie B, being however relegated immediately to Serie C. The club played in the minor leagues of Italian football ever since.

A.S. Biellese 1902
 
In the summer 1993 the provincial club of F.C. Vigliano, just promoted in Eccellenza Piemonte, changes its name to F.C.V. Biellese-Vigliano which becomes Biellese F.C. in 1997, for regaining A.S. Biellese 1902 only in 2001.

A.S. Biellese 1902 finished 17th in Girone A of Serie C2 2006-07 and was forced to play in the relegation playoffs, where it lost 3–2 on aggregate to 14th-placed Lumezzane, and was relegated to Serie D.

In the Serie D 2007–08 season, the team played in Girone A where it placed a distant second to Alessandria.  However, the team did participate in the Serie D playoffs but failed to qualify for the group stage of the tournament.

In the Serie D 2008–09 season, Biellese was placed first in Girone A and has won direct promotion to Lega Pro Seconda Divisione, but has decided to self-relegate to Eccellenza classifying in the season 2009–10, 11th.

In July 2010 the club was disbanded.

A.S.D. Junior Biellese Libertas
In summer 2010, two minor local clubs:
 A.S.D. Junior Biellese 2009, from the Terza Categoria and
 A.S.D. Libertas Biella Cossato, that has played in Promozione Piemonte group A the previous season placing 12th,
have decided to merge, for take the place of the old A.S. Biellese 1902, to form A.S.D. Junior Biellese Libertas.

It in the season 2010–11, it has maintained the same league of the A.S.D. Libertas Biella Cossato and has played so always in Promozione Piemonte group A who has won and thus was promoted to Eccellenza Piedmont and Aosta Valley.

Colors and badge
The team's colors are black and white.

References

External links
Official site

Football clubs in Piedmont and Aosta Valley
Association football clubs established in 1902
Italian football First Division clubs
Serie B clubs
Serie C clubs
Serie D clubs
Sport in Biella
1902 establishments in Italy
A.S.D. La Biellese